Neoscona adianta is a species of spider belonging to the family Araneidae. It occurs in North Africa and Europe to Central Asia.

The coloration includes a brown to red abdomen marked with a series of black-bordered white or cream triangles. The web is usually constructed among flower heads, the spider sitting in full view beside the web on a pad of silk.

References

adianta
Spiders described in 1802
Palearctic spiders